City TV is a Bosnian local commercial television channel based in Mostar, Bosnia and Herzegovina. The program is mainly produced in the Bosnian language.

References

External links 
 Communications Regulatory Agency of Bosnia and Herzegovina

Mass media in Mostar
Television stations in Bosnia and Herzegovina
Television channels and stations established in 2015